Lima is a station on Line A of the Buenos Aires Underground.  Passengers may transfer from here to the Avenida de Mayo station on Line C and Metrobus 9 de Julio. The station belonged to the inaugural section of the Buenos Aires Underground opened on 1 December 1913, which linked the stations Plaza Miserere and Plaza de Mayo.

References

External links

Buenos Aires Underground stations
Railway stations opened in 1913
1913 establishments in Argentina